Robert Edward Coontz (June 11, 1864 – January 26, 1935) was an admiral in the United States Navy, who sailed with the Great White Fleet and served as the second Chief of Naval Operations.

Early life
Robert Coontz, son of Benton Coontz, was born in Hannibal, Missouri. His parents were originally from Florida, Missouri, where they had been neighbors and schoolmates of a young Sam Clemens. Robert's father was involved in several businesses, including owning Hannibal's streetcar system. While a young boy, Robert Coontz left his name for posterity by carving it into the rock of Mark Twain Cave, then known as McDowell's Cave. After completing his primary education in Hannibal public schools, Coontz attended Inglesile College from 1878 to 1879, and Hannibal College (now Hannibal-LaGrange University) from 1879 to 1880. Coontz asked family friend Congressman William H. Hatch for an appointment to the United States Naval Academy. However, several other young men from the congressional district also desired the appointment so a competitive exam was arranged, which Coontz won.

Career

Coontz graduated from the Naval Academy in 1885, and served at the Navy Department and in several ships over the next decade, among them vessels stationed in Alaskan waters and the Great Lakes. He returned to the Navy Department late in 1894, to work on updating officer records, then was assigned to the cruiser , the Coast Survey and the cruiser . During the Spanish–American War Charleston and Coontz seized control of Guam, then joined Admiral George Dewey's forces in the Philippines. Coontz would remain in the Pacific, seeing action in the Philippine–American War. Following further duty afloat and ashore, Coontz, then a lieutenant commander, was Executive Officer of the battleship  during the 1907–1909 world cruise of the "Great White Fleet".

In 1899, Coontz became a Veteran Companion of the Pennsylvania Society of the Military Order of Foreign Wars.

After promotion to commander in 1909, Coontz was Commandant of Midshipmen at the Naval Academy.

On January 30, 1912, Coontz became the Governor of Guam, until September 23, 1913.

As Captain, Coontz served as Commanding Officer of the battleship , followed by duty as Commandant of the Puget Sound Navy Yard and the 13th Naval District. He held those positions until late in 1918. Following a brief period as acting Chief of Naval Operations, Rear Admiral Coontz assumed command of a battleship division in the Atlantic.

Coontz had just been assigned to the Pacific Fleet in September 1919, when he was selected to become Chief of Naval Operations (CNO), succeeding Admiral William S. Benson. Reportedly, his term as CNO was marked by unceasing pressure for economy, Congressional unhappiness over base closings, diplomatic efforts to achieve naval limitations, internal Navy Department conflicts over organization and the best ways to manage new technologies, plus the naval fallout of the Teapot Dome scandal. While dealing with these problems, Admiral Coontz established a unified United States Fleet and strengthened the CNO's position within the Navy Department.

Relieved as CNO in August 1923, by Admiral Edward W. Eberle, Coontz was able to return to sea as Commander in Chief of the United States Fleet.

In June 1925, as Admiral, Coontz led and command the US Fleet, consisting of 57 vessels of United States Navy carrying about 25,000 officers and crew, and departed the port of San Francisco, California. Coontz led the US Fleet on a trans-Pacific visit to New Zealand and Australia, byway of Hawaii and Pago Page, American Samoa. This was the first massed deployment of American battleships since the "Great White Fleet" cruise, nearly two decades earlier, and a valuable demonstration of their strategic reach. The last US Fleet departed Australia on August 6, 1925. The US Fleet played a significant role in strengthening Australia-American relations during the interwar years in the lead up to the signing of the formal ANZAS Alliance in 1941.

Coontz is also acknowledged for his key role in the promotion of US naval aviation. From October 1925, until his retirement in June 1928, Coontz served as Commandant of the Fifth Naval District, reverting to the rank of rear admiral.

Memoir 
After retiring, Coontz wrote a memoir chronicling his early life growing up in Hannibal, Missouri, and his navy career, titled From the Mississippi to the Sea. A second book, True Anecdotes of an Admiral, was published in 1934. Coontz was briefly recalled to active duty in 1930, to investigate railroads in Alaska. Two years later in 1932, Coontz would represent Alaska at the Democratic National Convention. It was also in 1932, that he became Commander-in-Chief of the Veterans of Foreign Wars.

Personal life 
On October 31, 1890, in Sitka, Alaska, Coontz married Augusta Cohen, daughter of Abraham Cohen. They had three children, Benton, Kenneth, and Bertha.

In 1934, Coontz suffered a series of heart attacks. On January 26, 1935, Coontz died at the Puget Sound Naval Hospital in Bremerton, Washington.

Coontz is buried in Mount Olivet Cemetery in Hannibal, Missouri.

Namesake
 The Admiral Coontz Armory in Hannibal, Missouri is named in his honor.
 Coontz Junior High School in Bremerton, Washington. Destroyed by fire December 15, 1974.

References

 Robert E. Coontz (1930) From the Mississippi to the Sea. Philadelphia: Dorrance & Co, Inc. See also

External links
 Who's Who in the day's news
 From the Mississippi to the Sea (autobiographical memoir by Adm. Coontz, 483pp, 1930)
 Naval Historical Center 
 

1864 births
1935 deaths
American military personnel of the Spanish–American War
Chiefs of Naval Operations
Commandeurs of the Légion d'honneur
Governors of Guam
Hannibal–LaGrange University alumni
People from Hannibal, Missouri
Recipients of the Navy Distinguished Service Medal
United States Naval Academy alumni
National Commanders of the Veterans of Foreign Wars